Bulbus may refer to:

Anatomy
A bulb-shaped anatomical structure, including:
bulbus, an archaic term for the medulla oblongata, as used for example in the term corticobulbar tract
Bulbus arteriosus
Bulbus cordis
Bulbus duodeni
Bulbus glandis
Bulbus oculi
Bulbus olfactorius
Bulbus penis
Bulbus pili
Bulbus urethrae
Bulbus vestibuli vaginae

Other
Bulbus (gastropod), a genus of predatory sea snails
Bulbus fritillariae cirrhosae, from Fritillaria plants